The Interns is an American medical drama series that aired on CBS from 1970 to 1971. It was based on the 1962 film The Interns and the 1964 sequel The New Interns.

Overview
The stories centered on the activities of Dr. Peter Goldstone (Broderick Crawford) and five medical interns at New North Hospital in Los Angeles. The series dealt with issues of the day including the racism faced by one of the African American interns. The other interns consisted of a newlywed, two bachelors, and a female.

Cast

Episodes

Reception

Most reviews were critical, citing the predictable and formulaic nature of the "new hip cast" of doctors. Clarence Petersen wrote in the Chicago Tribune:[The Interns] is pretty much like all the other doctor shows except maybe a bit more relevant because the doctors are a bit more hip. They are dedicated after the fashion of Ben Casey, of course, but unlike Ben, they also smile and laugh. In one scene, moreover, they all run down the street, as if they were doing a Pepsi commercial or auditioning for The Mod Squad, but they aren’t. They are trying to catch a bearded orderly who has slipped poison to a dying patient who wanted to end it quickly.

References

External links

The Interns at Television Obscurities

Television series by Screen Gems
1970 American television series debuts
1971 American television series endings
CBS original programming
English-language television shows
1970s American medical television series
Television shows set in Los Angeles